Federated States of Micronesia competed at the 2014 Summer Youth Olympics, in Nanjing, China from 16 August to 28 August 2014.

Athletics

Micronesia qualified one athlete.

Qualification Legend: Q=Final A (medal); qB=Final B (non-medal); qC=Final C (non-medal); qD=Final D (non-medal); qE=Final E (non-medal)

Girls
Track & road events

Swimming

Micronesia qualified two swimmers.

Boys

Girls

Weightlifting

Micronesia was given a quota to compete in a boys' event by the tripartite committee.

Boys

References

You
Nations at the 2014 Summer Youth Olympics
Federated States of Micronesia at the Youth Olympics